The Rochester Knighthawks were a lacrosse team based in Rochester, New York, United States, that played in the National Lacrosse League (NLL). The 2009 season was the 15th in franchise history.

In September 2008, Knighthawks superstar John Grant, Jr. underwent emergency surgery on his left knee to remove an infection from his ACL. The surgery meant that Grant would miss the entire 2009 season. To make up for the loss of their most potent scoring threat, the Knighthawks pulled an unexpected move: they traded forward Andrew Potter and two first round draft picks to the Colorado Mammoth for the rights to lacrosse legend Gary Gait, and convinced Gait to return to playing after a three-year retirement.

Regular season

Conference standings

Game log
Reference:

Playoffs

Game log
Reference:

Player stats
Reference:

Runners (Top 10)

Note: GP = Games played; G = Goals; A = Assists; Pts = Points; LB = Loose balls; PIM = Penalty minutes

Goaltenders
Note: GP = Games played; MIN = Minutes; W = Wins; L = Losses; GA = Goals against; Sv% = Save percentage; GAA = Goals against average

Transactions

New players
 Aaron Wilson - acquired in trade
 Gary Gait - acquired in trade
 Chris Courtney - acquired in trade

Players not returning
 Stephen Hoar - traded
 Andrew Potter - traded
 Jack Reid - traded
 John Grant, Jr. - injured, out for season
 Luke Forget - traded

Trades

Entry draft
The 2008 NLL Entry Draft took place on September 7, 2008. The Knighthawks selected the following players:

Roster

See also
2009 NLL season

References

Rochester
Rochester Knighthawks